is a three-episode original video animation (OVA) series based on the Fist of the North Star franchise, directed by Takashi Watanabe and produced by OB Planning. An English dubbed version of the OVA was produced by ADV Films in 2004.

Plot
In the 21st century, a nuclear war turned most of the Earth's surface into a desert wasteland, which also resulted in the contamination of the Earth's water supply. A man named Sanga has built the fortified haven of the "Last Land", where he rules as its dictator by monopolizing the city's uncontaminated water supply. When he learns that the neighboring residents of Freedom Village are trying to dig up a well for their own, Sanga sends his underlings to sabotage their effort. Kenshiro, master of Hokuto Shinken, gets involved in the conflict between the two regions after saving Tobi, an informant hired by Freedom Village.

Characters

The successor of the assassin's art of Hokuto Shinken. He gets involved in the conflict between Last Land and Freedom Village after saving Tobi.

 A wandering adventurer known for his intelligence service to the people, rescued by Kenshiro when the Sanga's scouting party ambushed him and other villagers searching for water. Tobi was searching his brother Bista while travelling from town to town. Later on, he incited a religious Jihad in the Lastland using his brotherly connection with Bista that eventually led to his downfall.
 , aka 

 Tobi's amnesiac little brother known for his illusion and parlour magic. He was taken by Sanga and was presented to the common people of Lastland as a God. His amnesia was healed by Sara through acupressure though he still remained seriously wounded throughout the OVA.
 

 A kind-hearted female healer in Freedom Village where she heals people with a passed-down knowledge of Hokumon no Ken through her parents. She uses a healing art which utilizes the bodys keiraku hikō points to heal her patients. Her life was saved by Seiji in the past when attacked by a feral dog.
 

 The dictator of the city Last Land, known for being manipulative and ambitious. He was killed by Kenshiro towards the end of first episode. Initially, he was acted to be cruel towards his son Seiji, but later revealed that he did that because he wanted Seiji to become stronger in the harsh wasteland.
 

 An oathbreaker of the Hokumon temple, who has a love-hate relationship with his father Sanga. He took over Lastland while Kenshiro was away to Hokumon temple get medicine for Bista. It was revealed that he learned all the secret of Hokumon No Ken in less than three years. Committed suicide by pressing a fatal point in his body after ridden with guilt over his past crime.

 The second of Kenshiro's eldest brothers, who intended to use Hokuto Shinken as a healing art. Appears in a flashback during the first episode of the OVA.

 The orphaned son of Raoh, whom Kenshiro intends to train as his Hokuto Shinken successor. Appears in a flashback during the first episode.

Kenshiro's deceased horse. Appears in a flashback during the first episode.

Episodes

Reception
The OVA grossed  in DVD sales, with a 200% return on investment. It earned  in overseas sales, exceeding domestic sales.

The ADV Films' dub of the trilogy has garnered positive reviews from critics. Chris Wood of Toon Zone praised "Kenshiro is in fine form, and though the story may not blow you away, it’s plenty adequate to support the action" Mike Toole of Anime Jump says that New Fist is "flashy and a little cheap, but ultimately rewarding." Chris Beveridge of AnimeOnDVD.com was "very pleased with" the first episode, but felt that the second episode could have been "much better written" and that the third episode was unnecessary and that the trilogy "could have been a lot tighter with a bit more streamlining of the script".

References

External links

Shin Hokuto no Ken at OB Planning 
New Fist of the North Star at ADV Films

2003 anime OVAs
ADV Films
Shueisha franchises
Fist of the North Star
Japanese serial novels
Martial arts anime and manga
Post-apocalyptic anime and manga